Jamui Assembly constituency is an assembly constituency in Bihar Legislative Assembly, located in Jamui district of Bihar, India. It is a segment of Jamui (Lok Sabha constituency).

Members of Legislative Assembly

Election Results

2020

1962
 Guru Ram Das (INC) : 12,056 votes
 Bhola Manjhi (CPI) : 7,714

References

External links
 

Assembly constituencies of Bihar